Al-Sahibiyah Mosque also known as Fustoq mosque ('جَامِع فُسْتُق' or 'جَامِع فُسْتَق', 'Jāmiʿ Fustaq' or 'Jāmiʿ Fustuq'), is a 14th-century mosque in Aleppo, Syria. It is located in the heart of the Ancient City of Aleppo, within the historic walls of the city, near the Khan al-Wazir, in front of Al-Matbakh al-Ajami palace.

History
The mosque was built in 1350 by Ahmad bin Yaqoub al-Saheb, a high-ranked officer of the Mamluk sultanate in the city of Aleppo. It was known as Al-Saheb madrasa The main entrance is located on the north side of the mosque and characterized with the traditional Islamic muqarnas. 

Many old inscriptions could be seen on the western wall of the mosque.

Gallery

References

Mamluk mosques in Syria
Mosques completed in 1350
Mosques in Aleppo
14th-century mosques